Ajkaceratops (pronounced "oi-ka-sera-tops") is a genus of ceratopsian dinosaur described in 2010. It lived during the Late Cretaceous in the western Tethyan archipelago, in what is now Europe. The type species, A. kozmai, is most closely related to forms in east Asia, from where its ancestors may have migrated by island-hopping. The generic name, Ajkaceratops, honors Ajka, a town in Hungary where the fossils were first discovered, combined with the given greek nomination ceratops, meaning "horned face".  The specific name, "kozmai", honors Károly Kozma.

Description
 
The holotype, cataloged as MTM V2009.192.1, consists only of a few skull fragments, including rostral bones, fused premaxillae, and maxillae fragments (beak and jaw fragments). These fossils are kept in the Hungarian Natural History Museum, in Budapest. Other material includes four predentary bones, cataloged as MTM V2009.193.1, V2009.194.1, V2009.195.1, and V2009.196.1; these are also believed to have belonged to Ajkaceratops, although they are proportionately smaller, and probably came from other individuals of the genus.

Classification
The fossils most closely resemble those of the Asian protoceratopsid Bagaceratops. Those similarities indicate Ajkaceratops is a ceratopsian related to the protoceratopsids, but more primitive than the Zuniceratops and the Ceratopsidae.

Palaeoecology
The fossils of Ajkaceratops were discovered in the Csehbánya Formation, which is interpreted as a floodplain and channel deposit formed by variegated clay, silt with interbedded grey and brown sand, and sandstone beds. This strata dates to the Santonian stage, around 86 to 84 million years ago. Ajkaceratops shared its environment with other dinosaurs such as Rhabdodon, the nodosaurid ankylosaurs, other non-avian theropods and enantiornithine birds, as well as eusuchian crocodiles, azhdarchid pterosaurs, bothremydid turtles and teiid lizards.

See also
 Timeline of ceratopsian research
 List of dinosaurs
 2010 in paleontology
 Haţeg Island

References

Coronosaurs
Santonian life
Late Cretaceous dinosaurs of Europe
Fossils of Hungary
Fossil taxa described in 2010
Taxa named by David B. Weishampel
Ornithischian genera